Panagitsa is a small stream in the south of the Patras area in northcentral Achaea, Greece. 
The source of the Panagitsa is on the western slope of the mountain Omplos, near Omplos Monastery. It flows northwest along the villages Krini and Ovrya. It flows into the Gulf of Patras in Paralia.

References

External links

Landforms of Achaea
Geography of Patras
Messatida
Rivers of Greece
Rivers of Western Greece
Drainage basins of the Ionian Sea